Sinpar was a French automobile company which was originally founded in 1907 and then restarted in 1946 by Léon Demeester. The company before World War I built voiturettes, while the post-war iteration specialized in off-road vehicles.

Pre-war
The Sinpar was originally French automobile manufactured from 1907 until 1914. The company built de Dion-Bouton-engined voiturettes in Courbevoie; cars used either 4½ CV or 8 CV power units. An 8 CV four produced from 1912 until 1914 was identical with the 8 hp Demeester.

The name "Sinpar" was derived from the Latin "sine par", meaning "without equal".

Interwar
Between the wars, the Sinpar shops engage in extending and reinforcing truck chassis, mostly Fords and Citroëns. They also sold other kits and parts such as upgraded axles, reduction and overdrive gear kits.

After 1946
After operations ceased during World War II, Léon Demeester, who had established the business back in 1907, resurrected it once again in 1946 along with his son Pierre. Sinpar now engaged in winch manufacture and heavy-duty transmission sub-assemblies for four- and six- wheel drive trucks. In the fifties, Sinpar expanded into manufacturing oil field trucks. In the 1960s, Sinpar also sold around 150 four-wheel drive trucks under its own brand. Called the Sinpar Castor, they used the cabin and many other parts from the Renault Estafette. These specialist items were provided to a range of industrial companies in France until 1975 when Saviem took over the company's activities.

In Autumn 1962 "Sinpar" launched an all-terrain light vehicle based on the Renault 4.

Sinpar is described in every annual edition of Automobilia. Toutes les voitures Françaises. from 1963 to 1980.

During the later 1960s the business increasingly focused on four-wheel drive conversions for various Renault models, notably the Renault Goélette (the vans mostly being destined for service with the French army) along with the Renault 4, Renault Rodéo, Renault 6 and the Renault 12. Although most of the cars were sold in France, useful volumes were also achieved in the more mountainous regions of Switzerland where there was significant customer demand for reasonably priced four-wheel drive cars which auto-makers were disinclined to address until the European arrival of the Subaru. Sinpar also manufactured the beach car version of the Renault 4, the "Plein Air."

Another source wrote Sinpar Appareils S.A. in Colombes with the make Sinpar for cars from 1964 to approx 1974. In the Eidgenoessische Typenpruefungskommission from Switzerland it was Appareils Sinpar from Colombes in 1973. 

In 1968 Sinpar designed the Torpedo S, a jeep-style car with body by Brissonneau and Lotz which did not enter production.

Together with the company's German agent, Rau GmbH of Stuttgart, Sinpar also helped develop a four-wheel-drive version of the Ford Transit in 1982. Reflecting the companies involved, it was called the SIRA-Ford Transit.

Subsequent to the 1976 death of Pierre Demeester, the company's future was uncertain. In 1980, Renault V.I. took over the company which continued to produce the modified all-terrain Renault-based vehicles at Chassieu. The new, Renault-owned business was still called "Sinpar", but now "Sinpar" was an acronym which stood for "Société Industrielle de Production et d'Adaptations Rhodanienne". 

In 1998 the company was fully subsumed into Renault V.I. and the Sinpar name was retired.

References

Defunct motor vehicle manufacturers of France